"Big Time" is the first single by pop singer C. C. Catch from her 5th studio album Hear What I Say, and was released in 1989 by Metronome. The single entered Top-30 German Charts, peaking at #26.

Track listing and formats 
Original versions

Big Time - 3:45
Big Time (Remix) - 6:45

1989 singles
C. C. Catch songs
1989 songs